Hintersee (German for either "rear lake" or "behind [the] lake") may refer to:

Municipalities:
 Hintersee, Mecklenburg-Vorpommern, a village in Landkreis Vorpommern-Greifswald, Mecklenburg-Vorpommern, Germany
 Hintersee, Austria, a village in Bezirk Salzburg-Umgebung, Austria
 Hintersee (Immenstadt im Allgäu), part of Immenstadt im Allgäu, Landkreis Oberallgäu, Bavaria, Germany
 Hintersee (Ramsau), part of Ramsau bei Berchtesgaden, Landkreis Berchtesgadener Land, Bavaria, Germany

Lakes:
 Hintersee (Ramsauer Ache), Ramsau bei Berchtesgaden, Berchtesgadener Land, Bavaria, Germany
 Hintersee (Osterhorngruppe), in Flachgau, Salzburger Land, Austria
 Hintersee (Felbertal), in Felbertal, Mittersill, Salzburger Land, Austria